
The Avia BH-17 was a biplane fighter aircraft built in Czechoslovakia in 1924. It was a development of the BH-6 and BH-8, and work on the latter aircraft was cut short in favour of this one. Operational trials in 1924 revealed performance good enough for the Czech Air Force to place an order for 24 examples. In actual service, however, the BH-17 proved unreliable and was soon withdrawn.

Specifications

See also

References

 
 
 Němeček, V. (1968). Československá letadla. Praha: Naše Vojsko.

1920s Czechoslovakian fighter aircraft
BH-17
Biplanes
Single-engined tractor aircraft